The Fifth cabinet of Hermann Jónasson in Iceland was formed 24 July 1956.

Cabinets

Inaugural cabinet: 24 July 1956 – 3 August 1956

First reshuffle: 3 August 1956 – 17 October 1956
Emil Jónsson replaced Guðmundur Ívarsson Guðmundsson as Minister for Foreign Affairs.

Second reshuffle: 17 October 1956 – 23 December 1958
Guðmundur Ívarsson Guðmundsson replaced Emil Jónsson as Minister for Foreign Affairs.

See also
Government of Iceland
Cabinet of Iceland

References

Hermann Jonasson, Fifth cabinet of
Hermann Jonasson, Fifth cabinet of
Hermann Jonasson, Fifth cabinet of
Cabinets established in 1956
Cabinets disestablished in 1958
Progressive Party (Iceland)